The  potC RNA motif is a conserved RNA structure discovered using bioinformatics.  The RNA is detected only in genome sequences derived from DNA that was extracted from uncultivated marine bacteria.  Thus, this RNA is present in environmental samples, but not yet found in any cultivated organism.
potC RNAs are located in the presumed 5' untranslated regions of genes predicted to encode either membrane transport proteins or peroxiredoxins.  Therefore, it was hypothesized that potC RNAs are cis-regulatory elements, but their detailed function is unknown.

A number of other RNAs were identified in the same study, including:
Lacto-usp RNA motif
mraW RNA motif
Ocean-V RNA motif
psaA RNA motif
Pseudomon-Rho RNA motif
rne-II RNA motif
STAXI RNA motif
TwoAYGGAY RNA motif
Whalefall-1 RNA motif
wcaG RNA motif
ykkC-yxkD leader

References

External links
 

Cis-regulatory RNA elements